Nina Blackwood is an American disc jockey and music journalist, who was the first of the original five MTV VJs (along with Mark Goodman, J. J. Jackson, Alan Hunter, and Martha Quinn). She has been an actress and model.

Early life and career
Blackwood was born Nina Kinckiner in Springfield, Massachusetts. Her father was in government service, and also taught Sunday school; he was never a minister, as has sometimes been reported. She grew up on the west side of Cleveland, Ohio, and attended Rocky River High School, graduating in 1970. In high school, she sang and played keyboards in her high school sweetheart's band, and covered the song "Venus."

Before entering broadcasting, Blackwood appeared nude in the August 1978 Playboy pictorial "The Girls in the Office" as a brunette.

She moved to California, and studied acting at the Strasberg Institute. Blackwood has acted in a number of TV show and films, making appearances in the movies Vice Squad (1982), Reckless Kelly (1993), and I Crave Rock & Roll (1996).

MTV and other television appearances
She was chosen for MTV's original video jockey lineup, along with Martha Quinn, Mark Goodman, Alan Hunter, and J. J. Jackson, when the network began airing in 1981. After leaving MTV in 1986, she hosted her own "Rock Report" for Entertainment Tonight. She also hosted the TV music show Solid Gold from 1986 to 1988. Blackwood has appeared on A Current Affair, Access Hollywood, VH1, Discovery Channel, National Geographic, and MSNBC.

Radio career
In 1999, Blackwood and long-time manager/producer Danny Sheridan launched a nationally syndicated radio show for United Stations Radio Network titled Nina Blackwood's Absolutely 80's. The two followed up with another nationally syndicated program, the 80's alternative-themed Nina Blackwood's New Wave Nation (which, as of 2014, was no longer being produced). Blackwood currently hosts a weekday show on Sirius XM Radio The 80s on 8 from 11 to 2 Eastern. On weekends she co-hosts the Sirius XM Radio show The Big '80s Top 40 Countdown with other original MTV VJ's.

She performed as part of the 2003 road company of The Vagina Monologues.

In popular culture
Blackwood has said that the 1984 John Waite hit single "Missing You" was written about her and that Waite has confirmed it was about her and other women he had dated.

Personal life
Blackwood, who was briefly married to a man named Dennis and has no children, lives on a farm in coastal Maine. A longtime animal lover, her farm acts as an animal sanctuary and is home to numerous dogs, cats, birds, horses and other creatures.

Blackwood is known for her raspy voice, something she's had since she was a child, and has stated that it's gotten more pronounced as she has aged.

References

External links

 Mark Goodman, Nina Blackwood, Alan Hunter interviewed on Stuck in the '80s podcast

Living people
American film actresses
American television actresses
American radio DJs
Actresses from Cleveland
Actors from Springfield, Massachusetts
Actresses from San Diego
VJs (media personalities)
American women radio presenters
Rocky River High School (Ohio) alumni
21st-century American women
Year of birth missing (living people)